Brian Keith Baldwin (July 16, 1958 – June 18, 1999) was an African-American man from Charlotte, North Carolina, United States of America, who was executed in 1999 in Alabama. Many believe that he was wrongfully convicted and sentenced for the 1977 murder of a young white woman in Monroe County of that state. The only evidence against Baldwin in the murder was his own confession, which he later retracted. He said that it was coerced by the local police in Wilcox County, Alabama, where he was arrested; they beat and tortured him under interrogation. A 1985 letter by his co-defendant Edward Dean Horsley surfaced in 1996, after Horsley had been executed for first-degree murder in the case. He wrote that he had acted alone in the rape and murder of Naomi Rolon, and that Baldwin had not known of her death.

Death penalty opponents regard this case as one in which racial bias contributed to the wrongful conviction by an all-white jury of an 18-year-old black man, in a county that was 46% black in population. Further, they believe he was executed despite evidence that he did not commit Rolon's murder. The appeals process was marked by conflicts of interest, as the presiding judge at Baldwin's trial also ruled on the appeals, against common practice. Before Baldwin's execution in 1999, leading political and religious figures petitioned Governor Don Siegelman for clemency on his behalf. Siegelman refused, saying that although he was "deeply troubled by some of the matters raised," he wrote "this matter does not rise to a level that warrants clemency."

Background
Brian Keith Baldwin was born in Charlotte, North Carolina in 1958. As a teenager, he got into trouble with the law. In March 1977 he was serving time in a juvenile facility in western North Carolina for stealing a car. On March 12, at age 18, he escaped with Edward Dean Horsley, Jr (known as Ed Dean, August 25, 1957 – February 16, 1996), then age 19, who had been convicted of armed robbery, a felony during which a police officer was shot.

Events
In March 1977, Naomi Rolon, a 16-year-old white girl, was driving in Hudson, North Carolina across town to visit her father in a hospital. She apparently picked up Baldwin and Horsley, who were hitchhiking. They robbed and stabbed her, raped her, and confined her to the car. They drove 40 hours with her in the trunk, traveling across state lines to Monroe County, Alabama. Horsley went off in the car with Rolon, returning alone. She was killed on March 14, 1977. The police found Rolon's body and car beside a rural road in Monroe County.

The next day, March 15, the pair stole a truck in nearby Wilcox County, Alabama, where they were captured and arrested after a high-speed case by county police. They both gave statements at the Wilcox County jail. Baldwin later said that he was beaten and tortured there, finally confessing to the murder of Rolon to end the punishment. Neither man was advised of his rights, including right to counsel, nor was either allowed to contact family.

They were taken to court in Monroe County, where Rolon had been found. They were each indicted for aggravated robbery and murder. This combination of charges amounted to capital crime; each man was thus eligible for the state's mandatory death penalty if convicted. The presiding judge at trial would hold a sentencing hearing to determine if there were mitigating circumstances to reduce the penalty. Each was tried separately.

Horsley confessed to the murder of Rolon; he was executed for first-degree murder in 1996.

Baldwin later said that after he was arrested as a suspect, the local police beat him and subjected him to shocks from an electric cattle-prod, forcing him to confess to Rolon's murder. He later retracted the confession (which had incorrect material facts both about how Rolon died and the nature of the murder weapon). Three witnesses testified to seeing bruises on Baldwin's back and body after the interrogation.

Nathaniel Mazdie, the only black deputy sheriff in Monroe County at the time, later testified that he had seen Baldwin being beaten to coerce his confession and that a cattle prod was present at the jail. He also said that he had falsely signed an affidavit saying that Baldwin had been advised of his rights, including the right to counsel. But in 1999, from a nursing home, he told Gov. Don Siegelman in an interview that he had not seen the beating.

The judge refused funds for Baldwin's defense. The court-appointed lawyer spent very little time with Baldwin and called no defense witnesses, although Baldwin had some who could attest to his beating by police. Baldwin's fingerprints were found only in the car. He was not indicted for the rape but the prosecution referred to it at trial. The robbery of the car and violence against the victim were aggravating factors used to justify the capital charge of first-degree murder against Baldwin.

There was no physical evidence tying Baldwin to the murder: he had no blood on his clothes (in contrast to Horsley), and there were no Baldwin fingerprints on the murder weapon. (Note: Forensic analysis determined that the murder was committed by a left-handed person, but Baldwin was right-handed. The defense did not obtain the latter evidence until 1999; the prosecution had not made it available at the time of his trial, and the jury never heard it.)

The trial and verdict were completed in 1 1/2 days, August 8 and 9, 1977.

Baldwin was convicted by an all-white jury, although the population of the area of the jury pool was 46% black. (Exclusion of African Americans from a jury in such cases, where they form a significant part of the local population, was ruled as unconstitutional in Batson v. Kentucky (1986) by the United States Supreme Court). Baldwin's parents were not informed of his whereabouts until after the trial ended, and he was convicted of capital murder.

Appeals
The direct appeal related to whether Alabama had jurisdiction to try the case, because the abduction and robbery of Rolon occurred in North Carolina. The charges increased to kidnapping after she was taken across state lines. Judge Robert E. Lee Key, who had presided over Baldwin's trial and conviction, heard this appeal. But it is normally accepted in law that the same judge cannot preside over a hearing to appeal his own case. He ruled that Alabama had jurisdiction because Rolon's murder was committed there.

Multiple appeals of Baldwin's case were filed on the conviction and trial proceedings, based primarily on the following issues: 
Failure to advise suspect of rights, including right to counsel
Coerced confession under torture
Ineffective defense counsel
Racially biased jury selection

Long before his execution, Horsley had testified in writing in 1985 that he alone had committed the murder of Rolon and that Baldwin had not known of her death. The prosecutor's office did not give this letter to Baldwin's counsel until after Horsley's execution in 1996.

Baldwin's appeals case was taken to the United States Supreme Court, by which time 33 senior judges and prosecutors had signed a letter supporting Baldwin. The Supreme Court declined to reverse the conviction on murder and the death sentence. The Pope, former president Jimmy Carter, the Archbishop of Mobile, Alabama; 26 members of the Congressional Black Caucus of the United States Congress, and Coretta King, widow of Martin Luther King, petitioned the state to prevent Baldwin's execution, but they were unsuccessful.

During an investigation in 1999, in an attempt to recover case evidence for DNA analysis (not available at the time of the trial), it was found that all evidence in the case was lost or destroyed after Baldwin's execution.

See also
 Capital punishment in Alabama
 Capital punishment in the United States
 List of people executed in Alabama

References

1958 births
1999 deaths
20th-century African-American people
20th-century executions by Alabama
20th-century executions of American people
American people executed for murder
Executed African-American people
People executed by Alabama by electric chair
People from Charlotte, North Carolina